Nick Paul Anderson (born July 5, 1990) is an American professional baseball pitcher for the Atlanta Braves of Major League Baseball (MLB). He has previously played in MLB for the Miami Marlins and Tampa Bay Rays.

Career

Amateur career
Anderson attended Brainerd High School in Brainerd, Minnesota. He played college baseball at St. Cloud State University in St. Cloud, Minnesota for three years (2009–2011). He transferred to NAIA Mayville State University in Mayville, North Dakota, for his senior season in 2012. In 12 games (11 starts) his senior year, he went 5–2 with a 1.95 ERA.

Independent Leagues
The Milwaukee Brewers selected Anderson in the 32nd round of the 2012 MLB draft. He did not sign with the Brewers and played in the independent baseball Frontier League for three seasons. He played for the Rockford RiverHawks/Aviators in 2012 and 2013, and for the Frontier Greys in 2015.

Minnesota Twins
Anderson's contract was purchased by the Minnesota Twins in August 2015. He played in 9 games for the Cedar Rapids Kernels in 2015, recording a 0.75 ERA in 12 innings. He split the 2016 season between Cedar Rapids and the Fort Myers Miracle, accumulating a 4–3 record with a 2.65 ERA in 57.2 innings. In 2017, he played for Fort Myers and the Chattanooga Lookouts, accumulating a 4–1 record with a 1.00 ERA in 53.1 innings. He spent the 2018 season with the Rochester Red Wings, going 8–2 with a 3.30 ERA in 60 innings.

Miami Marlins
On November 20, 2018, the Twins traded Anderson to the Miami Marlins for Brian Schales, and the Marlins added him to their 40-man roster.

Anderson made the Marlins' 2019 Opening Day roster. On March 28, 2019, he made his major league debut against the Colorado Rockies. Anderson retired Ryan McMahon, the only batter he faced. 

Anderson collected his first major league win on May 21 in a 5-4 11-inning game against the Detroit Tigers. He pitched the final two innings allowing no runs while striking out a career-high five batters. Before July 31, 2019, Anderson had appeared in 45 games with 69 strikeouts in  innings.

Tampa Bay Rays
On July 31, 2019, Anderson was traded to the Tampa Bay Rays (along with Trevor Richards) in exchange for Jesús Sánchez and Ryne Stanek. He continued his dominance after the trade, registering an ERA of 2.11 in  innings with 41 strikeouts.

In 2020, he went 2–1 with six saves and an 0.55 ERA in 16.1 innings over 19 games.

In the 2020 postseason, as the Rays made their second World Series appearance in franchise history, Anderson went 7 consecutive postseason appearances while allowing a run, breaking an MLB record. On March 25, 2021, it was announced that Anderson had suffered a partial tear of his elbow ligament and would miss time until at least the All-Star break. On March 26, Anderson was placed on the 60-day injured list. Anderson was activated from the injured list on September 12 to make his season debut. Anderson was able to work to a 4.50 ERA in 6 appearances for the Rays in 2021.

On October 27, 2021, Anderson underwent right elbow surgery to repair his ulnar collateral ligament with an internal brace procedure. The surgery was an alternative to Tommy John surgery, but Anderson was projected to remain out through the 2022 All-Star break.

On March 22, 2022, Anderson signed a $845,000 contract with the Rays, avoiding salary arbitration. On November 9, 2022, Anderson was placed on outright waivers.

Atlanta Braves
On November 11, 2022, Anderson signed a one-year, non-guaranteed split contract with the Atlanta Braves.

Personal life
In 2010, while at St. Cloud State University, Anderson received a drunken driving charge and in 2011 he spent eight days in jail on an assault charge that involved a baseball bat and alcohol. He received probation and underwent mandatory Alcoholics Anonymous and anger management classes.

References

External links

1990 births
Living people
People from Crosby, Minnesota
Baseball players from Minnesota
Major League Baseball pitchers
Miami Marlins players
Tampa Bay Rays players
St. Cloud State Huskies baseball players
Mayville State Comets baseball players
Rockford RiverHawks players
Rockford Aviators players
Frontier Greys players
Cedar Rapids Kernels players
Fort Myers Miracle players
Chattanooga Lookouts players
Rochester Red Wings players